Evil Town is a 1987 American zombie horror film directed by Curtis Hanson, Mardi Rustam, Larry Spiegel and Peter S. Traynor. Evil Town was the last film with the actor Dean Jagger.

Synopsis
The film depicts an evil scientist's (Dean Jagger) campaign to achieve eternal youth, through synthesizing a drug derived from human pituitary fluid. In extracting the fluid, he creates mindless zombies from the donors. Because the local town residents are in on the plot, to achieve immortality, they help the scientist, by abducting visitors who come through town.

Cast
 James Keach as Dr. Chris Fuller
 Dean Jagger as Dr. Schaeffer
 Robert Walker Jr. as  Mike
 Doria Cook-Nelson as Linda
 Lynda Wiesmeier as Dianne
 Michele Marsh as Julie
 Christie Houser as Terrie
 Dabbs Greer as Lyle Phelps
 Regis Toomey as Doc Hooper
 Lurene Tuttle as Mildred Phelps
 Richard Hale as Lester Wylie
 Hope Summers as Mrs. Wylie
 E. J. André as Earl

Production
The film went into production in 1984 and went through numerous re-writes and re-edits before release in 1987. It is made up of footage of several older films, with major footage coming from the unfinished Dean Jagger film God Bless Dr. Shagetz (1974). When the pieces of the various older films were patched together, there was inclusion of some new footage, including some with Jillian Kesner and nude scenes with Playboy Playmate Lynda Wiesmeier.

Pre spin-off
When beginning work on Evil Town in 1984, director Mardi Rustam liked the story enough to make his own version, which he released as Evils of the Night (1985), two years before the release of Evil Town.

Reception
Cavett Binion of All Movie Guide called it a "silly horror film" and noted that it was an assemblage of parts of earlier films, including an unfinished one from the 1970s, and that it was "spiced up with some gratuitous nudity courtesy of former Playboy playmate Lynda Wiesmeier". While remarking that the editor's efforts to maintain continuity were commendable, he concluded that "the end result seems hardly worth the effort".

Release
The film was scheduled for release on June 3, 1987, but due to the high level of anticipation for the movie, many theaters began showing it on the evening of June 2, 1987. It was released in the United States on VHS in November 1987.

References

External links
 
 
 

1987 films
1987 horror films
American zombie films
Films directed by Curtis Hanson
Films scored by Charles Bernstein
1980s English-language films
1980s American films